Nenasi is a town in Pekan District, Pahang, Malaysia. Nenasi is a great area for camping, fishing and barbecue activities on the beach and forest.

There are fisherman village, beach, swamps, rice fields, rivers and forest to explore. Nenasi also a famous place to watch firefly due to its natural swamps. Most of their residence work as a fisherman.

References

Pekan District
Towns in Pahang